Peyhan (also Romanized as Peyhān and Pīhān; also known as Pāhīān, Pahyān, Paihān, and Pey Mān) is a village in Kamazan-e Sofla Rural District, Zand District, Malayer County, Hamadan Province, Iran. At the 2006 census, its population was 583, in 146 families.

References 

Populated places in Malayer County